Nisam anđeo (trans. I'm Not An Angel) is the third studio album from Serbian pop singer Marija Šerifović. The album was released in 2008.

Track listing
"Nisam anđeo"
"Jedan dobar razlog"
"Sve po starom"
"Ne voliš je znam"
"Podvala"
"Zabranjena priča"
"Kasno da te menjam"
"Vreme je da krenem"
"Bolji život"

External links
 Marija Šerifović Official Page (Serbian and English)
 On: www.discogs.com

Marija Šerifović albums
2008 albums